Very Confidential is a 1927 American comedy film directed by James Tinling, written by Randall Faye, and starring Madge Bellamy, Patrick Cunning, Mary Duncan, Joseph Cawthorn, Marjorie Beebe and Isabelle Keith. It was released on November 6, 1927, by Fox Film Corporation.

Cast       
Madge Bellamy as Madge Murphy
Patrick Cunning as Roger Allen
Mary Duncan as Priscilla Travers
Joseph Cawthorn as Donald Allen
Marjorie Beebe as Stella
Isabelle Keith as Adelaide Melbourne
Carl von Haartman as Chauffeur

References

External links
 

1927 films
1920s English-language films
Silent American comedy films
1927 comedy films
Fox Film films
Films directed by James Tinling
American silent feature films
American black-and-white films
1920s American films